Cuatro (stylized as cuatro°, "Four") is a Spanish free-to-air television channel that was launched in November 2005. Owned by Mediaset España, the Spanish subsidiary of the Italian Mediaset group, it is broadcast on TV frequencies licensed to the previous owner Sogecable in 1990 and previously used by them for the analogue transmission of its pay-per-view channel Canal+.

History
In 1990, Canal+ began broadcasting in Spain, however, due to their license conditions, they could only broadcast six hours on free-to-air television, while to access the programming for the rest of the day it was necessary to pay a monthly fee. 15 years later, Sogecable, the company that owned the channel at that time, began efforts to change its transmission license and be able to broadcast 24 hours a day for free. In July 2005 the Government of Spain approved the request.

On November 7, 2005 at 8:44 p.m., Cuatro began broadcasting, replacing Canal+.

In 2006, Cuatro scored a massive coup by striking a deal with the Royal Spanish Football Federation and Spain's national football team allowing it to show all of the team's matches, and it also concluded an agreement with rival channel La Sexta to share the rights to broadcast the games of general interest in the 2006 FIFA World Cup. It snatched this licence from TVE, who had held the rights to the national team's matches for years. In 2008, together with satellite platform Digital+, owned by the same company, Cuatro secured the rights to broadcast the UEFA Euro 2008 championship, scoring the highest ratings in the history of Spanish television (since 1992). The two broadcasters also achieved rights for 2010 FIFA World Cup. 

On 18 December 2009, Mediaset, controlling shareholder of Gestevision Telecinco and Promotora de Informaciones, S.A, proprietor of Sogecable, presented an agreement to merge their television channels (Telecinco and Cuatro). After the merger, Cuatro and its broadcasting license Sogecable separated, and the company - Sogecuatro - was purchased in full by Gestevision Telecinco. Along with this act, PRISA bought newly issued shares of Gestevision Telecinco, 18% of the equity of this company. This agreement makes Gestevision Telecinco in the largest television network in Spain by audience share. In total the group has a total of seven channels, in Terrestrial Television in Spain: Telecinco, Cuatro, LaSiete, FactoríaDeFicción, Boing, Canal+Dos, CNN+, Telecinco HD and Canal Club.

The president of the resulting string (which will keep the brands and editorial of both chains) is Alejandro Echevarria, with two CEOs who are Paolo Vasile (Contents) and Giuseppe Tringali (Advertising). PRISA also has two CEOs and holds the vice presidency of the operator.

Prior to this agreement, formalized the entry of Mediaset in the shareholding of Digital +, with 22% of the shares.

Programming

Cuatro's programming is general, however, it is mainly aimed at a male audience, which is why the spaces for information, sports, entertainment and reality shows stand out, as well as movies and series. Since the merger with Telecinco, the channel has become the group's second in importance, so its programming is more experimental and alternative, with the aim of competing with Atresmedia's LaSexta. Occasionally the channel also broadcasts some live events such as sports or news coverage.

Cuatro programming includes Supermax, Las mañanas de Cuatro, Cuarto milenio, Tulli, La Liga, 9-1-1, SpongeBob SquarePants, Siren and Castle.

Production
Cuatro currently broadcasts in 16:9 for most of the programs, but in 4:3 for a minority of programming including films and older series.

References

External links
 

Channels of Mediaset España Comunicación
4
Television channels and stations established in 2005
Spanish-language television stations